Bubba Hernandez and Alex Meixner were nominated in the Best Polka album category in the 50th Annual Grammy Awards for their self-titled debut album, Polka Freak Out.

He is a former member of the Denton, Texas-based band, Brave Combo. During his tenure with Brave Combo he won two Grammys. One for Polkasonic in 2000 and the second for Let's Kiss in 2005.
He is currently the front member of Los Super Vatos, also based out of Denton, where he primarily plays bass.

References

External links
Official website

American male singers
Singers from Texas
Latin music musicians
Living people
Year of birth missing (living people)